Control Freaks or control freak, may refer to:

 Control freak, a person who needs to be in control

Film and Television
 Control Freaks (TV series), a weekly video game review television show
 Control Freaks (TV episode), a 2005 episode of the television show "Danny Phantom", see List of Danny Phantom episodes
 Control Freak! (TV episode), a 2001 episode of the television cartoon Pokemon, see List of Pokémon episodes (seasons 1–13)

Music

Albums
 Control Freaks (album), the 2003 debut album by UK r&b/pop girl group Sirens
 Control Freaks - The Remixes, a 2007 album by British indie band GoodBooks
 Control Freak (album), a working title for the 2007 Mya album "Liberation"

Songs
 Control Freak (song), a 1997 song by Recoil off the album Unsound Methods
 Control Freak (song), a 1999 song by Godflesh off their album Us and Them (Godflesh album)
 Control Freak (song), a 2000 song by Venom off the album Resurrection (Venom album)
 Control Freak (song), a 2003 song by Stereomud of their album Every Given Moment
 Control Freak (song), a 2004 song by Saul Williams off the album Saul Williams (album)
 Control Freak (song), a 2005 song by Armin van Buuren off the album Shivers (album)
 Control Freak (song), a 2006 song by Copeland off their album Eat, Sleep, Repeat
 Control Freak (single), a 2006 single by Danny Byrd
 Control Freak (song), a 2008 song by Bigelf off their album Into the Maelstrom (album)
 Control Freak (song), a 2011 song off the album What Is Troubling You by Sodagreen
 Control Freak (song), a 2012 song by Steve Aoki off the album Wonderland (Steve Aoki album)
 Control Freak (song), a 2017 song by The Fizz off their album The F-Z of Pop
 Control Freak (song), a 2019 song by Priests off the album The Seduction of Kansas

Other uses
 Control Freak (Teen Titans), a DC Comics supervillain
 Control Freaks: 7 Ways Liberals Plan to Ruin Your Life (book), a 2010 book by Terence P. Jeffrey

See also

 
 
 
 
 Control Freek (album) a 2009 album by Tash
 Control (disambiguation)
 Freak (disambiguation)